The Yangtse Evening Post or Yangtze Evening Post, also known as Yangtse Evening News or Yangtze Evening News, is a Nanjing-based Chinese language state newspaper published in China. It is one of world's most circulated newspapers.  The paper is affiliated with the Xinhua News Agency.

History
On January 1, 1986, Yangtse Evening Post was launched in Nanjing. It is an evening newspaper established by Xinhua Daily, an official newspaper of the Jiangsu Provincial Committee of the Chinese Communist Party.

References

External links
 Current official website of Yangtse Evening Post 
 Current official website of Yangtse Evening Post 

Daily newspapers published in China
Chinese-language newspapers (Simplified Chinese)
Publications with year of establishment missing
Mass media in Nanjing
Xinhua News Agency